Ernophthora milicha is a species of snout moth in the genus Ernophthora. It was described by Turner in 1931, and is known from Australia.

References

Moths described in 1931
Cabniini